Daniela Vega Hernández (born June 3, 1989) is a Chilean actress and mezzo-soprano singer. She is best known for her critically acclaimed performance in the Academy Award-winning film A Fantastic Woman (2017). At the 90th Academy Awards in 2018, Vega became the first transgender person in history to be a presenter at the Academy Awards ceremony. In 2018, Time magazine named her one of the 100 most influential people in the world.

Early life 
Born on June 3, 1989 in San Miguel, Santiago Province, as the first child of Igor Alejandro Vega Inostroza and Sandra del Carmen Hernandez de la Cuadra. Vega began studying opera with her grandmother at the age of eight. Growing up, she attended an all-boys school where she was bullied. It was while she was attending the all-boys school in her teens that she realized she was a girl and began to transition. Her parents and younger brother Nicolás were supportive of her, despite the conservative nature of Chile at that time. Vega described suffering depression for the three years of transition due to the lack of opportunities in Chile to progress her education or express herself, but Vega's parents were supportive and her father encouraged her to go to beauty school, and later theater school.

Career

2011–2017: Early roles and breakthrough 

Vega was asked by a writer and director to collaborate on a stage piece about transitioning, using her experience as a foundation. Her contribution resulted in her going on to star in the eventual stage production, Martin de la Parra's 2011 play La mujer Mariposa (The Butterfly Woman). This piece, where she also had the opportunity to sing, ran for eight years in Santiago. During this time, she participated in more pieces, most notably in Migrante (Migrant), a piece about migration. Vega's profile was elevated to a wider audience when she appeared in the music video of the famous song "Maria" by Manuel García in 2014. The song and music video were made in collaboration with a gay suicide prevention organization, to help raise awareness and prevent suicide in gay teens. She made her screen debut in 2014 in a drama called The Guest (La visita), playing a trans woman at her father's wake.

The 67th Berlin International Film Festival saw the release of A Fantastic Woman (2017), directed by Sebastián Lelio, a film for which her performance was acclaimed by critics. A Fantastic Woman tells the story of Marina (played by Vega) and Orlando (played by Francisco Reyes), an older man with whom she is in love and planning a future. After Orlando falls ill and dies, Marina is forced to face family and society, and fight again to show who she is: a fantastic woman. Critic Guy Lodge in a review for Variety praising Vega's performance said: "Vega's tough, expressive, and subtly distressed performance deserves far more than political praise." He continued to note that "It’s a multi-layered, emotionally polymorphous feat of acting, nurtured with pitch-perfect sensitivity by her director, who maintains complete candor on Marina’s condition without pushing her anywhere she wouldn’t herself go." Her name was strongly mentioned for an Oscar nomination as Best Actress. She won an award for her performance at the Palm Springs International Film Festival for Best Actress in a Foreign Language Film. A Fantastic Woman went on to win the Academy Award for Best Foreign Language Film, and Vega became the first openly transgender person ever to be a presenter at the Academy Awards ceremony in 2018.

In 2018, it was announced that Vega would have a recurring role in the Netflix miniseries Tales of the City.

Media image
Vega became the first transgender person in history to be an Academy Awards presenter in 2018. Time magazine named Vega one of the 100 most influential people in the world in 2018.

Filmography

Film

Television

Awards and nominations

References

External links
 

1989 births
Transgender actresses
Transgender singers
Living people
Chilean film actresses
Chilean opera singers
Chilean LGBT singers
Chilean LGBT actors
Chilean transgender people
21st-century Chilean actresses
Mezzo-sopranos
21st-century Chilean LGBT people